Dex Hamilton: Alien Entomologist is a children's animated television series, which is an international co-production between March Entertainment in Canada and SLR Productions in Australia.

Broadcast
The series first screened on Network Ten in 2008 and is designed for kids aged 6 and older.

It began airing on CBC Television in Canada in January 2010 and aired 10:30am EST on Saturday mornings, but had stopped by 2019 when the series was picked up by Toonavision.

Qubo aired the series in the United States until 27 December 2014.

Episodes
There are 26 episodes of 25 minutes duration each. Episodes are usually screened in a half-hour timeslot.

Series synopsis
It is the year 3000. Dex Hamilton, a young entomologist and wildlife explorer is called into action when alien insects crawling through the galaxy create a dangerous rift between man and nature. Accompanied by his team of scientists, Zap Monogan, Jenny 10 and Tung "the fantastic frog boy", Dex sets out to observe and capture these strange specimens.

Meanwhile, a villain is genetically modifying super bugs to destroy all worlds.

It is currently unknown whether there will be a follow-up season.

Characters
Dex Hamilton (Dwayne Hill) – The titular protagonist. Dex is an intelligent alien entomologist with a great love for insects. He runs The Habitat, where he and the others maintain a large variety of different habitats in which they can observe insects they've captured for study. He has a Broad Australian accent.

Zap Monogan (Lyon Smith) – A human/insect hybrid found by Dex a few months before the series. He has a very laid-back attitude which can sometimes get on the others' nerves, but in a dire situation he'll always drop the act. He's the strongest in the group, and can grow insect wings that allow him to fly. He's also the group's pilot. It is eventually revealed that Zap was created to be a powerful weapon by an evil scientist who used his own DNA to create Zap's human side. When his insect side takes control and runs rampant in the city, Jenny 10 manages to calm him down and he returns to his human form. Zap appears to have fallen for Jenny 10, although he probably won't admit it.

Jenny 10 (Stephanie Anne Mills) – Created as part of the 'Jenny Project', Jenny 10 now works as Dex's mechanic at The Habitat. She maintains the insect's habitats and builds the weapons used by the team to capture new bugs. She's always known that she was part of the 'Jenny Project', but she only told the others when Jenny 8 showed up. The project was designed to create ten genetic clones each with their own unique ability. Jenny 10 has super intelligence and Jenny 8 can turn invisible, but the other eight Jenny's abilities were unknown. They appear to have perished in an accident at a young age, which Jenny 8 and Jenny 10 escaped. Over the series, Jenny 10 has developed strong feelings for Zap.

Tung (Carter Hayden) – A human/frog hybrid from another planet. Tung tends to have disgusting hygiene habits and strange taste in food. He can jump long distances and scale walls with little effort, and also has a long tongue, hence the nickname. He sometimes gets in trouble for eating the insects captured on a mission.

The Habitat
The Habitat is a large technological complex that houses all of Dex's insects. It was funded by the Mayor of Metropolis. The Habitat is composed of a matrix of special holding cells that simulate the insect's natural environment. The technology that The Habitat runs on is cutting edge, managed, with efficiency, by Jenny Ten. Among these technology is a farm of high-end satellite arrays.

Film
March Entertainment announced the release of Dex Hamilton: Fire and Ice, a full-length prequel film released in 2D and cel-shaded 3D computer animation, scheduled to be broadcast late December 2009 on CBC, before the series' premiere on CBC in 2010 (having already premiered on Network 10 in 2008).

Game
In 2010, March released Dex Hamilton's Bug Quest, a Flash-based online game featuring the show's characters. The game was hosted on the CBC's website as well as the show's official site.

References

External links
Jon Izen (director website)

Network 10 original programming
Australian children's animated action television series
Australian children's animated space adventure television series
Australian children's animated comic science fiction television series
2008 Australian television series debuts
2000s Australian animated television series
Canadian children's animated action television series
Canadian children's animated space adventure television series
Canadian children's animated comic science fiction television series
2008 Canadian television series debuts
2000s Canadian animated television series
Hamilton, Dex
Animated television series about extraterrestrial life